Wilderlands Hex Sheets is a supplement for fantasy role-playing games published by Judges Guild in 1977.

Contents
Wilderlands Hex Sheets is a GM's aid: hex maps for preparation of wilderness scenario maps.

Publication history
Wilderlands Hex Sheets was published by Judges Guild in 1977 as four large map sheets and a cover sheet.

A listing of cumulative sales from 1981 shows that Wilderlands Hex Sheets sold over 20,000 units.

Reception

References

Judges Guild fantasy role-playing game supplements
Role-playing game supplements introduced in 1977